James Joseph Duane (born July 30, 1959) is an American law professor at the Regent University School of Law, former criminal defense attorney, and Fifth Amendment expert. Duane has received considerable online attention for his lecture "Don't Talk to the Police", in which he advises citizens to avoid incriminating themselves by speaking to law enforcement officers.

Early life and education
Duane was born in Buffalo, New York, and is a descendant of the Revolutionary-era leader Judge James Duane. He received his AB magna cum laude from Harvard College in 1981 and his JD cum laude from Harvard Law School in 1984. Duane was elected to the Phi Beta Kappa honor society while at Harvard.

"Don't Talk to the Police" lecture
In 2008, Duane gave a lecture at Regent University alongside Virginia Beach Police Department officer George Bruch, in which they explain in practical terms why citizens should never talk to police under any circumstances. 

Using former Supreme Court Justice Robert Jackson as support of his "Don't Talk to the Police" advice, Duane says (among other things) that:
Even perfectly innocent citizens may get themselves into trouble even when the police are trying to do their jobs properly, because police malfeasance is entirely unnecessary for the innocent to convict themselves by mistake;
talking to police may bring up erroneous but believable evidence against even innocent witnesses; and,
individuals convinced of their own innocence may have unknowingly committed a crime which they inadvertently confess to during questioning. This follows the reasoning of Justice Robert Jackson in Watts v. Indiana.

A video of Duane's lecture posted on YouTube by Regent University has been viewed over 17 million times by 2022, and has been called a "YouTube sensation" by The Independent. In 2016, Duane clarified that his advice does not extend to routine traffic stops. The lecture continues to be popular on YouTube and received support from security expert Bruce Schneier.

Other work
Duane has also written about his views that there are bizarre legislative drafting errors in the Virginia Statute on Privileged Marital Communications as well as issues involving the introduction of hearsay evidence at trial (known as "bootstrapping"). Duane, a member of the advisory board of the Fully Informed Jury Association, has also written in defense of jury nullification.

Selected bibliography

References

External links
 , Regent University School of Law

1959 births
Living people
American legal scholars
Harvard Law School alumni
People from Chesapeake, Virginia
Regent University faculty
Jury nullification
Fifth Amendment to the United States Constitution